Cisneros may refer to:

Cisneros (surname), people with the surname Cisneros
Cisneros, Palencia, a municipality in Castile and León province, Spain
Cisneros Group, a conglomerate of companies belonging to Venezuelan entrepreneur Gustavo Cisneros
Cisneros, Antioquia, a town in Colombia
Cisneros, Valle del Cauca, a village in Buenaventura municipality, Valle del Cauca Department in Colombia.

See also
Cisne (disambiguation)
Villa Cisneros, former name of Dakhla, Western Sahara